West Sydney, an electoral district of the Legislative Assembly in the Australian state of New South Wales was created in 1859 and abolished in 1894.


Election results

Elections in the 1890s

1891

1890 by-election

Elections in the 1880s

1889

1887

1885

1882

1880

Elections in the 1870s

1877

1877 by-election

1874

1872

December 1870 by-election

March 1870 by-election

Elections in the 1860s

1869

1868 by-election

1866 by-election

October 1865 by-election

July 1865 by-election

February 1865 by-election

1864

October 1863 by-election

January 1863 by-election

1860

Elections in the 1850s

1859

Notes

References 

New South Wales state electoral results by district